Washington Parish (French: Paroisse de Washington) is a parish located in the interior southeast corner of the U.S. state of Louisiana, one of the Florida Parishes. As of the 2020 census, the population was 45,463. Its parish seat is Franklinton. Its largest city is Bogalusa.  The parish was founded in 1819.

Washington Parish comprises the Bogalusa, LA Micropolitan Statistical Area, which is included in the New Orleans-Metairie-Hammond, LA-MS Combined Statistical Area.

History
Washington Parish was formed in 1819 by splitting off from St. Tammany Parish. Franklinton was designated as the parish seat on February 10, 1821.

Washington Parish is the most northeasterly of what are called the Florida Parishes. Great Britain took over control of this French territory east of the Mississippi River in 1763 after defeating France in the Seven Years' War. But France had also ceded some territory to Spain. This area was under contention, and English and American settlers tried to set up an independent state here in 1810. The United States annexed the territory, later settling with Spain in a treaty. Through much of this period, the French influence remained strong in the region, especially in its former colonial cities.

This area was rural and forested with virgin longleaf pine (Pinus palustris L.) In the early 20th century, entrepreneurial brothers Frank and Charles W. Goodyear, already successful businessmen from Buffalo, New York, purchased hundreds of thousands of acres of forest in this area and in southwestern Mississippi. They established the Great Southern Lumber Company, constructed a huge sawmill (the largest in the world at the time) in the middle of the forest, and developed Bogalusa, Louisiana, as a company mill town. In the early 20th century, there were numerous confrontations as workers attempted to unionize and companies hired private militia to suppress such activities.

The company housing for workers was divided by Jim Crow custom and state laws on racial segregation into sections for "Americans" and another for "colored" and foreign workers. It also built housing for supervisors, and supporting facilities, such as several hotels, churches, a YMCA and YWCA, schools, and other services within a year, opening facilities in 1907. To access the timber and transport processed lumber from the mill to markets, the company built the New Orleans Great Northern Railroad, connecting Bogalusa to the port of New Orleans.

Well before World War II, the virgin forest was harvested. Great Southern Lumber Company closed the sawmill in 1938. Its paper mill and chemical operations continued. Gradually in the late 20th century, these operations declined. As jobs left, the population dropped in such industrial towns. Some people moved to new or emerging industries in New Orleans and other major cities.

Government
The Washington Parish Government is a Home Rule Charter or "President-Council" form of Government. Its current President, elected at-large, is Richard N. Thomas, Jr. The seven council members are each elected from single-member districts.

Geography

Adjacent counties and parishes
 Pike County, Mississippi  (northwest)
 Walthall County, Mississippi  (north)
 Marion County, Mississippi  (northeast)
 Pearl River County, Mississippi  (east)
 St. Tammany Parish  (south)
 Tangipahoa Parish  (west)

Major highways
  Louisiana Highway 10
  Louisiana Highway 16
  Louisiana Highway 21
  Louisiana Highway 25

National protected area
 Bogue Chitto National Wildlife Refuge (part)

State park
 Bogue Chitto State Park

Communities

City 
 Bogalusa (largest municipality)

Town 
 Franklinton (parish seat)

Villages 
 Angie
 Varnado

Unincorporated communities 

 Enon
 Mount Hermon
 Pine
 Thomas
 Warnerton

Demographics

As of the 2020 United States census, there were 45,463 people, 17,613 households, and 11,924 families residing in the parish.

As of the census of 2000, there were 43,926 people, 16,467 households, and 11,642 families residing in the parish. There were 19,106 housing units at an average density of 28 per square mile (11/km2). The racial makeup of the parish was 67.42% White, 31.53% Black or African American, 0.23% Native American, 0.17% Asian, 0.11% from other races, and 0.54% from two or more races.  0.76% of the population were Hispanic or Latino of any race.

There were 16,467 households, out of which 32.70% had children under the age of 18 living with them, 49.30% were married couples living together, 17.10% had a female householder with no husband present, and 29.30% were non-families. 26.60% of all households were made up of individuals, and 12.50% had someone living alone who was 65 years of age or older.  The average household size was 2.56 and the average family size was 3.09.

In the parish the population was spread out, with 26.80% under the age of 18, 9.50% from 18 to 24, 26.70% from 25 to 44, 22.60% from 45 to 64, and 14.30% who were 65 years of age or older.  The median age was 36 years. For every 100 females there were 95.40 males.  For every 100 females age 18 and over, there were 92.80 males.

The median income for a household in the parish was $24,264, and the median income for a family was $29,480. Males had a median income of $27,964 versus $17,709 for females. The per capita income for the parish was $12,915.  About 19.40% of families and 24.70% of the population were below the poverty line, including 32.20% of those under age 18 and 20.40% of those age 65 or over.  Washington Parish has the second highest level of poverty in the state after Orleans Parish.

Economy
Washington Parish is currently known for its agriculture, particularly  watermelons. Through much of the 20th century, its economy was based on its timber and paper industry.

In 1906, The Great Southern Lumber Company, founded by the Goodyear brothers from New York, purchased huge tracts of forest and established a sawmill in Bogalusa to harvest the local virgin pine forests. This company was the first to introduce reforestation in order to sustain the timber industry locally. Taken over by Crown Zellerbach, it later started a paper mill and chemical businesses in the area.

The local business passed through several hands as the lumber and related industries restructured through the late 20th century. In the 21st century, Temple-Inland Corporation is the largest employer in the parish.

Education
Students residing outside of Ward 4, most of the parish, attend Washington Parish School System. Students within Ward 4 attend Bogalusa City Schools. The Bogalusa district serves the City of Bogalusa, Rio, and some unincorporated areas.

Northshore Technical Community College is located in Bogalusa.

Corrections
Louisiana Department of Public Safety and Corrections operates the B.B. "Sixty" Rayburn Correctional Center near the village of Varnado,LA.

National Guard
Bogalusa is home to the headquarters of the 205th Engineer Battalion of the 225th Engineer Brigade.  Franklinton is the home of the 843rd Engineer Company.

Notable people 
 Oneal Moore (1931-1965), US Army veteran and first African-American deputy sheriff in Washington Parish Sheriff's Office; murdered while in uniform in a drive-by shooting, June 2, 1965. Case never solved.
 Henry "Tank" Powell (born 1945), state representative from Tangipahoa Parish from 1996 to 2008; member of the Louisiana Board of Pardons since 2008
 Weldon Russell (born 1946), former state representative for Tangipahoa and St. Helena parishes; born in Washington Parish
 Malinda Brumfield White (born 1967), state representative for Washington and St. Tammany parishes, effective 2016
 Katherine Haik (born 2000), from Franklinton, named Miss Teen USA 2015 at the age of fifteen

See also
 National Register of Historic Places listings in Washington Parish, Louisiana
 Bogue Chitto State Park

References

Sources
 "Washington Parish, Louisiana" by Janice M. Berfield, 1968
 "History of Washington Parish", by Hon. Prentiss B. Carter
 Bogalusa Story, by C. W. Goodyear
 Bogalusa, Washington Parish, Louisiana: History, Links, Maps, and Photos
 Bogalusa Daily News

External links
 Washington Parish Government
 Washington Parish Assessor
 Washington Parish Clerk of Court
 Washington Parish Free Fair
 The Era-Leader Newspaper, Franklinton
 Washington Parish School System
 Washington Parish Sheriff's Office
 Washington Parish Tourism Bureau
 Washington Economic Development Foundation
 D. A. Varnado Store Museum
 Bogalusa Daily News
 "Bogalusa Story" by C. W. Goodyear
 Explore the History and Culture of Southeastern Louisiana, a National Park Service Discover Our Shared Heritage Travel Itinerary
            Article by Robert Higgs LAGenWeb Washington Parish History Washington Parish Louisiana Wikispace
 Bogalusa, Washington Parish, Louisiana: History, Links, Maps, and Photos
 Some Photos of Hurricane Katrina Damage

Geology
 Heinrich, P. V., R. P. McCulloh, and J. Snead, 2007, Bogalusa 30 x 60 minute geologic quadrangle. Louisiana Geological Survey, Baton Rouge, Louisiana.

 
Louisiana parishes
Parishes in New Orleans metropolitan area
1819 establishments in Louisiana
Populated places established in 1819